Cristopher Paolo César Hurtado Huertas (born 27 July 1990), commonly known as Paolo Hurtado, is a Peruvian professional footballer who last played for Chilean club Unión Española as a winger.

Club career

Alianza Lima
Hurtado made his first team debut with Alianza Lima on 17 February 2008. Knowing he would not have much opportunities in Alianza he decide to go out on loan to Juan Aurich. After a successful loan period Hurtado became a regular in the Alianza Lima first team, proving to be one of their most influential players.

Paços de Ferreira
In 2012, he signed with Portuguese team F.C. Paços de Ferreira and swiftly proved his worth, becoming a key player.

Reading
On 12 August 2015, Hurtado signed a three-year contract with Reading of the Championship. After struggling to settle in England and also struggling for game time at Reading, Hurtado signed a loan deal with Vitória de Guimarães on 28 January 2016 until 30 June 2016. On 3 August 2016, Reading confirmed that Hurtado had returned to Vitória de Guimarães on a season-long loan.

Vitória Guimarães
On 20 July 2017, Reading confirmed that Hurtado had moved to Vitória Guimarães permanently for an undisclosed fee.

International career
In May 2018 he was named in Peru's provisional 24 man squad for the 2018 FIFA World Cup in Russia.

Career statistics

Club

International

Statistics accurate as of match played 26 June 2018

International goals
Scores and results list Peru's goal tally first.

References

External links

1990 births
Living people
Sportspeople from Callao
Association football wingers
Peruvian footballers
Peruvian expatriate footballers
Peru international footballers
Club Alianza Lima footballers
Juan Aurich footballers
F.C. Paços de Ferreira players
Peñarol players
Reading F.C. players
Vitória S.C. players
Konyaspor footballers
PFC Lokomotiv Plovdiv players
Unión Española footballers
Peruvian Primera División players
Primeira Liga players
Uruguayan Primera División players
English Football League players
Süper Lig players
First Professional Football League (Bulgaria) players
Chilean Primera División players
Peruvian expatriate sportspeople in Portugal
Peruvian expatriate sportspeople in Uruguay
Peruvian expatriate sportspeople in England
Peruvian expatriate sportspeople in Turkey
Peruvian expatriate sportspeople in Bulgaria
Peruvian expatriate sportspeople in Chile
Expatriate footballers in Portugal
Expatriate footballers in Uruguay
Expatriate footballers in England
Expatriate footballers in Turkey
Expatriate footballers in Bulgaria
Expatriate footballers in Chile
2015 Copa América players
2018 FIFA World Cup players